Steven Antone Pegues (born May 21, 1968) is a former Major League Baseball player.

Career 
Pegues was drafted in the first round of the 1987 amateur draft by the Detroit Tigers and debuted with the Cincinnati Reds on July 6, 1994. During his rookie campaign he batted .361 in 18 games with both the Reds and the Pittsburgh Pirates.

External links
, or Retrosheet
Pura Pelota (Venezuelan Winter League)

1968 births
Living people
African-American baseball players
American expatriate baseball players in Canada
American expatriate baseball players in Mexico
Baseball players from Mississippi
Bristol Tigers players
Cincinnati Reds players
Colorado Springs Sky Sox players
Fayetteville Generals players
Indianapolis Indians players
Iowa Cubs players
Lakeland Tigers players
Las Vegas Stars (baseball) players
London Tigers players
New Haven Ravens players
Major League Baseball outfielders
Olmecas de Tabasco players
Ottawa Lynx players
Pastora de Occidente players
People from Pontotoc, Mississippi
Pittsburgh Pirates players
Richmond Braves players
Tiburones de La Guaira players
American expatriate baseball players in Venezuela
Toledo Mud Hens players
Winnipeg Goldeyes players
21st-century African-American people
20th-century African-American sportspeople